The 1982 season was the Minnesota Vikings' 22nd season in the National Football League and their first in the newly constructed Hubert H. Humphrey Metrodome. The team was looking to improve on its 7–9 record from 1981. However, a players strike meant seven of the team's 16 games were canceled, and each NFL team was only allowed to play nine games. The Vikings won their opener against the Tampa Bay Buccaneers before losing the next week to the Buffalo Bills, a game in which they had a 19–0 lead before the Bills pulled off a miraculous comeback to win 23–22. After the strike ended, the Vikings lost 26–7 to the Packers in Green Bay before beating the Bears 35–7 the following week to sit at 2–2. After a loss to the Dolphins, the Vikings won their next two games to sit at 4–3. In their final game of the season, they upset the Dallas Cowboys 31–27 to clinch the NFC's fourth place spot in the playoffs (as divisions were ignored in 1982 and the standings were determined by conference). In the playoffs, the Vikings defeated the Atlanta Falcons 30–24 to reach the divisional round. However, in that game, they lost 21–7 to the eventual champion Redskins.

Offseason

1982 Draft

 The Vikings traded their third-round selection (66th overall) to the New Orleans Saints in exchange for RB Tony Galbreath.
 The Vikings traded their fifth-round selection (120th overall) and 1981 sixth-round selection (154th overall) to the Miami Dolphins in exchange for OL Jim Langer.

Roster

Preseason

Regular season
The Vikings opened their new stadium with a 17–10 win over Tampa Bay in the season opener. A close loss to Buffalo on the road followed.

The season was then interrupted by the players' 57-day strike that reduced the NFL regular season to nine games. Upon resumption of play in November, the Vikings went 4–3 to close out the abbreviated regular season and closed the campaign with a 5–4 record. Games against Chicago, Detroit, Green Bay, New Orleans, San Francisco, Tampa Bay and Washington were canceled.

As three of Minnesota's losses were to AFC opponents, their 4–1 conference record put them at the top of a logjam of teams with similar records in the playoff seedings. In 1982, the NFL took the top eight teams from each conference regardless of division record for playoff consideration. The Vikings earned the #4 seed based on this tiebreaker and home field advantage in round one.

In their opening round playoff game, the Vikings took on the Atlanta Falcons. The game was a back-and-forth affair that saw Minnesota take a 13–7 halftime lead, only to see the Falcons retake the lead late in the final period on a 41-yard field goal by Mick Luckhurst. With just under two minutes remaining, the Vikings began a game-winning drive that culminated in a Ted Brown 5-yard touchdown run to win the game and send the Vikings on to round two.

In the second round, the Vikings were defeated by the eventual Super Bowl champion Washington Redskins, 21–7, at RFK Stadium. The Vikings trailed 14–0 after one quarter. Ted Brown's touchdown run in the second period cut it to 14–7, but Joe Theismann hit Alvin Garrett late in the quarter with an 18-yard touchdown strike to make it 21–7. Neither team scored in the second half.

QB Tommy Kramer threw for 2,037 yards and 15 touchdowns in the short season. RB Ted Brown had 515 yards to lead all rushers, and WR Sammy White tallied 503 yards and five touchdowns to lead receivers.

LB Matt Blair anchored the Vikings defense and also made the 1982 Pro Bowl.

Schedule

Note: Intra-division opponents are in bold text.

Game summaries

Week 1: vs Tampa Bay Buccaneers

Week 4: vs Chicago Bears

Week 5: at Miami Dolphins

Week 6: vs Baltimore Colts

Week 8: vs New York Jets

Standings

Postseason

Schedule

Statistics

Team leaders

League rankings

References

1982
Minnesota
Minnesota Vikings